Horní Břečkov is a municipality and village in Znojmo District in the South Moravian Region of the Czech Republic. It has about 300 inhabitants.

Administrative parts
The village of Čížov is an administrative part of Horní Břečkov.

Geography
It borders Austria to the south and is adjacent to the Austrian town of Hardegg.

Horní Břečkov lies in the Jevišovice Uplands. The western and southern municipal border is formed by the Thaya River. Most of the territory lies in the Podyjí National Park.

History
The first written mention of Horní Břečkov is in a deed of King John of Bohemia from 1323.

Allocated to newly established Czechoslovakia in 1919, Horní Břečkov was annexed by Nazi Germany upon the 1938 Munich Agreement and incorporated into Reichsgau Niederdonau. After World War II, it was returned to Czechoslovakia and the German-speaking population was expelled.

Sights
The landmark of Horní Břečkov is the Church of Saint Clemens. A stone with carved year 1198 indicates that this is one of the oldest churches in the region. The church has a late Gothic core, but it was completely rebuilt in the Renaissance style in the 16th century and baroque reconstructed in 1748 and 1831.

References

External links

Villages in Znojmo District